Micromonospora lutea is a Gram-positive, aerobic and spore-forming bacterium from the genus Micromonospora which has been isolated from mangrove sediments in Guangdong Province, China.

References

External links
Type strain of Verrucosispora lutea at BacDive -  the Bacterial Diversity Metadatabase	

Micromonosporaceae
Bacteria described in 2009